Sarik Garnikovich Andreasyan (born 1984) is a Russian-Armenian director, producer, and screenwriter who has worked on films and commercials. He is the founder of Enjoy Movies. In May 2017, Andreasyan left Enjoy Movies studio to start another studio, Bolshoe Kino (Big Movies in Russian).

His early movies were mostly low-budget comedies. However, since 2015, Sarik began to move towards science fiction, action and dramas.

Reception
Most of Andreasyan's films were met with negative critical reception in Russian media, according to review aggregators Kritikanstvo and Megacritic. Notable exceptions are the drama Earthquake and anthology film duology Moms, that received more positive reviews. Only two movies by Andreasyan were rated by Rotten Tomatoes, both American Heist and Guardians have a "rotten" rating.

His early comedies, such as The Pregnant ($8.3M Gross), Moms ($7.8M Gross), What Men Do! ($11.3M Gross), were commercial hits. Andreasyan's recent high-budget movies, however, are considered box office bombs, according to various Russian media. This includes American Heist, Mafia: The Game of Survival, and Guardians.

Andreasyan's disaster drama film Earthquake was selected as the Armenian entry for the Best Foreign Language Film at the 89th Academy Awards, but was disqualified by the Academy.

Filmography

References

External links
 

Living people
Film people from Yerevan
Russian people of Armenian descent
Russian film directors
1984 births